Sinclair Beiles (b. Kampala, Uganda, 1930 - 2000, Johannesburg) was a South African beat poet and editor for Maurice Girodias at the Olympia Press in Paris. He developed along with William S. Burroughs and Brion Gysin the cut-up technique of writing poetry and literature.

Beiles was involved with American beat poets Allen Ginsberg, Gregory Corso and Brion Gysin, and Burroughs at the legendary Beat Hotel in Paris. The photographer Harold Chapman recorded this period in his book The Beat Hotel (Gris Banal, 1984). He co-authored Minutes to Go with Burroughs, Gysin and Corso (Two Cities Editions, 1960). Beiles helped edit Burroughs' Naked Lunch.

He worked with the Greek artist Takis and read his magnetic manifesto -- "I am a sculpture... I would like to see all nuclear bombs on Earth turned into sculptures"—in 1962 in Paris at the Iris Clert Gallery. At this event he was famously suspended in mid-air by a magnetic field from a powerful magnet in a sculpture developed by Takis. Beiles attributed his subsequent mental instability to this experience even though he insisted that Takis provide him with a helmet to protect his head from the magnetic field.

Beiles wandered through Europe, including a spell in London and settled in the Greek islands during the 1970s. He fought frequent bouts of depression, mental illness and drug addiction. He was married to the South African poet and artist Marta Proctor.

In later life he returned to South Africa and was associated with the Johannesburg-based Gallery III  group of poets, writers, composers and performance artists and lived in the central and artistic district of Yeoville. He and the South African columnist and playwright Ian Fraser formed a friendship which lasted many years. The poet had a burst of writing activity from 1991 to 2000, publishing a large number of poetry collections, including A South African Abroad (Lapis Press, 1991). He died in relative poverty.

The independent filmmaker Anton Kotze made a short film called "Sacred Fix" (26 minutes, South Africa, 1997), which is a documentary portrait of Sinclair Beiles.

A collection of writings about Sinclair Beiles called Who was Sinclair Beiles? was published by Dye Hard Press, Johannesburg, in 2009, co-edited by Gary Cummiskey and Eva Kowalska.

Works by Sinclair Beiles 
(S. B. as) Wu Wu Ming: Houses of Joy. Olympia Press, Paris, 1959.
S. B., William S. Burroughs, Brion Gysin, Gregory Corso: Minutes To Go. Two Cities Editions, Paris 1960
Ashes of Experience. Wurm, 1969
Deliria. Cold Turkey Press, Rotterdam 1971. Edited by Gerard Bellaart.
Tales: Poems. Gryphon Poets, 1972
Sacred Fix. Cold Turkey Press, Rotterdam, 1975
Universal Truths as Revealed in White Tobacco Fumes. Writers Forum, London. 1976.
Ballets, 1978
Dowsings, 1980
Poems Under Suspicion, Poems On Bits Of Paper (with Marta Proctor) 1982
The Crucifixion, Two Cities, 1984
A South African Abroad, Lapis Press, 1991
On-Stage, Limited Editions, 1994
Aardvark City, or Hieronymous Hotel, Limited Editions, 1994
Khakiweeds, Limited Editions, 1995
Deliria. Small Spaces Press, 1995. First edition: Cold Turkey Press, Rotterdam, 1971.
Yeoville: Poems, Nugget Press, 1996
Sugar, Nugget Press, 1996
Plays (Harlem King of the Negroes; My Brother Frederico; Chopin in Majorca), Nugget Press, 1996
The Greek Plays (Electra; Punch and Judy; Genesis; Mme Sausolito), Nugget Press 1996
3 Plays (Picasso by Max Jacob; Suzanne Valedon; Colette), Nugget Press, 1996
The Golden Years, Nugget Press, 1997
Nagmaal, Nugget Press, 1997
Bicycle Tales, Nugget Press, 1997
Springtime at Raubenheimers, Nugget Press, 1998
Women, Nugget Press 2000
A Jew Takes A Look At Guatemala, Nugget Press, 2000
The Idiot's Voice, Cold Turkey Press 2012
Bone Hebrew, Cold Turkey Press 2013

External links
Beat Bits: 
The Beat Hotel, Barry Miles, 
Beat Hotel Tribute: 
Beiles article at Empty Mirror- ¨Sinclair Beiles: A Man Apart¨: 
Harold Chapman Beat Hotel photos: 
James de Villiers & Gallery III 
Photo Of Gallery III 
Poetry Links: 

1930 births
2002 deaths
South African male poets
Beat Generation writers
People from Kampala
People from Johannesburg
20th-century South African poets
South African expatriates in France
20th-century South African male writers